Idanre Forest Reserve is in Idanre local government area of the Nigerian state of Ondo, in the south-west part of the country.

It is a lowland rainforest with an altitude of 10 to 400 meters.

References

Forest Reserves of Nigeria